Monica Gill is an American model, actress, beauty pageant title holder.

Gill won the Miss India Worldwide 2014 on 21 June 2014. She is also Miss India USA winner on 26 November 2013 while serving as Miss India New England. In 2015, she participated in MTV India show India's Next Top Model.

Career 
Gill was working in pharmaceuticals trying to figure out if she wanted to pursue her medical career. After winning Miss India Worldwide USA, Gill decided to pursue Bollywood in India. Her pageant win opened up many doors in the Indian film industry including a meeting with Tips that lead to a three-film deal. Gill was originally hoping to land roles in Bollywood but her Hindi-speaking skills were an issue. Coming from Punjabi family, Gill was fluent in speaking Punjabi and decided to pursue Punjabi films instead. Gill landed a talent agent in Mumbai and went to acting school before making her film debut.

Gill made her Punjabi film debut in the 2016 Tips' film Ambarsariya opposite Diljit Dosanjh. That year, she went on to star in three back to back blockbuster Punjabi films. The following year, she made her Hindi film debut in the 2017 K9 film Firangi. In 2018, she was seen in the Hindi film Paltan, where she played love interest to Harshvardhan Rane. In 2019, she acted in Punjabi-language period drama Yaara Ve. Monica supported the 2020–2021 Indian farmers' protest.

Personal life 
Gill met Gurshawn Sahota, a California-based dentist at her cousin's wedding. The couple maintained a long-distance relationship, getting engaged in 2018. Gill moved back home with her parents to plan her wedding but due to the pandemic, their wedding has been on hold until it is safe to hold inperson events.

Gill and Sahota parted ways due to irreconcilable differences in Nov of 2021. She is single and currently living in New York City.

Filmography

References

External links

 

Living people
1980s births
Punjabi people
American female models
American film actresses
American actresses of Indian descent
American people of Punjabi descent
Actresses from Boston
Actresses in Hindi cinema
Actresses in Punjabi cinema
American expatriate actresses in India
Year of birth missing (living people)
21st-century American actresses